Gachon University Station (formerly Kyungwon Univ. Station) is a station on the Suin-Bundang Line between Bokjeong and Taepyeong. It serves the nearby Global campus of Gachon University. On 28 December 2011, Gachon Univ. Station was renamed from Kyungwon Univ. Station.

Vicinity
Exit 1 : Gachon University
Exit 2 : West Seongnam Elementary School
Exit 3 : Taepyeong Middle School
Exit 4 : Gachon Univ. EX-HUB (To Pangyo)
Exit 5 : Gachon Univ. EX-HUB (To Songpa)

References

Seoul Metropolitan Subway stations
Metro stations in Seongnam
Railway stations opened in 1994